European route E31 is an international Class-A road in Europe, part of the United Nations E-road network. It has a north–south reference.

It runs from Rotterdam, Netherlands to Ludwigshafen, Germany.

Firstly, it leaves Rotterdam, where it links to the E19 and E25 roads. It heads roughly east through the Netherlands, passing through Gorinchem (where it connects to the E311), and Nijmegen before crossing the border into Germany.

It passes first through Goch and Krefeld in North Rhine-Westphalia and heads southwards before entering Cologne, where it links with four other E-roads: the E29, the E35, the E37, and the E40. It then continues south, going through Koblenz (where it connects to the E44), and then on to Bingen am Rhein, where it makes its final connection, to the E42. It then reaches its final destination of Hockenheim, where the E31 connects with the E50.

The route from Parma to La Spezia in Italy, although identified as E33 in the E-network, is also signposted as E31.

External links 
 UN Economic Commission for Europe: Overall Map of E-road Network (2007)

31
E031
031